Jelena Dokić was the defending champion, but did not complete in the Juniors this year.

Lina Krasnoroutskaya won the title, defeating Nadia Petrova in the final in what was the second all-Russian Girls' singles Grand Slam final. This win solidified her ranking to become the Year-End Junior World No. 1.

Seeds

  Virginie Razzano (third round)
  Nadia Petrova (final)
  Jennifer Hopkins (quarterfinals)
  Melissa Middleton (first round)
  Iroda Tulyaganova (semifinals)
  Lina Krasnoroutskaya (champion)
  Eleni Daniilidou (semifinals)
  Mia Buric (second round)
  Laura Bao (first round)
  Stanislava Hrozenská (third round)
  Laura Granville (quarterfinals, withdrew)
  Hannah Collin (second round)
  Anastasia Rodionova (third round)
  Anikó Kapros (quarterfinals)
  Dája Bedáňová (quarterfinals)
  Katarína Bašternáková (first round)

Draw

Finals

Top half

Section 1

Section 2

Bottom half

Section 3

Section 4

References
 Main Draw

Girls' Singles
US Open, 1999 Girls' Singles